The 2010 Crawley Borough Council election took place on 6 May 2010 to elect members of  Crawley Borough Council in West Sussex, England. One third of the council was up for election and the Conservative Party stayed in overall control of the council.

After the election, the composition of the council was:
Conservative 26
Labour 11

Election result

Ward results

Bewbush

Broadfield North

Broadfield South

Furnace Green

Ifield

Langley Green

Maidenbower

Northgate

Pound Hill North

Pound Hill South and Worth

Southgate

West Green

References

2010 English local elections
May 2010 events in the United Kingdom
2010
2010s in West Sussex